Hurricane Liza was the third hurricane of the 1968 Pacific hurricane season. Forming from an area of the Intertropical Convergence Zone (ITCZ) on August 28 and reaching tropical storm strength in the same day, Liza meandered generally westward over the Pacific Ocean, reaching hurricane strength on August 29 while far from land. It maintained that intensity until September 2, when the hurricane was downgraded to a tropical storm, but avoided tropical depression status despite the presentation seen by an Air Force reconnaissance plane. After weakening, the storm moved northwestward, weakening to a depression on September 4, when it began a turn to the east. There is a possibility that the depression completed a small loop between the downgrade and its dissipation on September 6.

Although it remained far from land, the waves triggered by Liza were able to reach California, where they combined with high tide, threatening beachfront homes that had weakened foundations after a previous tide. The hurricane was responsible for sweeping hundreds of Labor Day swimmers out into the ocean in Zuma Beach and Newport Beach, all of whom were saved by lifeguards. The waves also tore off a group of sundecks estimated at $5,000 (1968 USD) near Laguna Beach.

Meteorological history

For a period beginning on August 25, the ITCZ was active near the border between Mexico and Guatemala. The conditions developed in a northward bend in the ITCZ that was moving westward. No activity other than clusters of rain were shown on satellite until August 28, when a tropical disturbance suddenly developed along the bend, reaching tropical depression status as the day began. Satellite pictures showed a vortex arrangement consisting of three cloud masses and two arching bands of cumulonimbus clouds, all of which were producing cirrus outflow.

The tropical storm moved west-northwest for 48 hours after being named, reaching hurricane intensity on August 29, with satellite pictures showing an eye. Until September 1, all ships kept out of range of the hurricane, leaving satellite imagery as the only method for obtaining information. The August 30 ESSA-6 satellite image of the hurricane showed a circular eye embedded in a nearly circular central dense overcast (CDO) spanning 5° of latitude in diameter. Inflow was apparent in feeder bands from the south, but a large area of dry air and clear skies spanned to the north and west of the hurricane. It was estimated that the hurricane was at its peak intensity at this time. On August 31, the CDO had shrunk, but the cyclone still maintained intensity until September 1, when the hurricane had moved over cooler water and began to weaken due to cold inflow. The weakening of the hurricane accelerated, becoming uncoupled from the warm waters and losing its cirrus cap, exposing the center. An Air Force reconnaissance plane sent to investigate the storm on September 2 showed that the hurricane had weakened into a tropical storm. However, the cyclone was so disorganized at this time that the observer remarked that there was a possibility that Liza was no longer even a tropical storm. The storm continued to evaporate and was downgraded to a depression on September 4 and drifted southwestward until it dissipated on September 6.

Disputes
There are two disputes between the Joint Typhoon Warning Center, the best track data, and the post-season report concerning the hurricane. The first involved the peak intensity of the hurricane. However, the JTWC and the best track data both gave peak intensities equivalent to the ship report on September 1. Liza was the first of three hurricanes of the season that was thought to have reached Category 3 strength. The other two were Pauline and Rebecca.

Another dispute exists concerning the track the hurricane took, specifically between the downgrade to tropical depression and dissipation. The best track and ESSA report both showed that Liza went southwestward through the time period. However, the JTWC final report on Liza reported that Liza made a tiny loop that was entirely within 24°N to 25°N latitude and 125°W to 126°W longitude from September 4 to September 6.

Impact and records

Officials at Long Beach were keeping an eye on breakwater activity and Laguna Beach lifeguards were prepared in case the swells reported there grew. At Newport Beach, the Corps of Engineers were brought in to create a buffer with sand and rock to protect homes between 41st Street and 46th Street, and concern in West Newport Beach was that the hurricane would cause more damage to oceanfront homes that were weakened by swirling seas the previous week. The waves were expected to be the only cause of damage from the hurricane, which forecaster Emii Kurtz remarked was "much too far away" to affect atmospheric weather conditions.

Due to the Labor Day beach turnout, many reports of rescuing swimmers who were swept up by waves caused by the hurricane were received. On September 2, forty-seven swimmers in Zuma Beach had to be rescued despite warnings to stay out of deep water, and an additional 261 rescues were reported in Newport. More rescues were reported the next day, although no exact total from the second day is known. At the El Morro Beach Trailer Park near Laguna Beach, a group of sundecks estimated at $5,000 (1968 USD) were ripped from their supports by rough seas. Long Beach, in terms of damage, was particularly hit hard by Liza, with debris and sea foam from the heavy surf clogging storm drains. A group of tidal pools formed along an area of the beach, draining out from a parking lot on 72nd Street onto Ocean Boulevard, resulting in flooding that closed a section of the boulevard between 68th Place and 72nd Place to traffic. Various flower gardens were also reported to have been swamped by the flooding, but no damage to housing was reported. The weakened properties in West Newport Beach also sustained no additional damage.

See also

List of Pacific hurricanes
Other storms with the same name

References

Hurricanes in California
1968 Pacific hurricane season
Category 1 Pacific hurricanes
1968 in California
1968 natural disasters in the United States